Mikhail Spartakovich Plyatskovsky (1935–1991) was a Soviet songwriter and playwright.

Biography 
Born 2 November 1935 in Yenakiyeve. He graduated from the Maxim Gorky Literature Institute.

He was a member of the Union of Soviet Writers (1973).

He worked in collaboration with Vladimir Shainsky, Serafim Tulikov, Vyacheslav Dobrynin,  Yuri Antonov, Arno Babajanian.

Plyatskovsky died on 26 January 1991. He was buried in Moscow on Troyekurovskoye Cemetery.

Works 
The first professional song written by composer Semyon Zaslavsky March of the astronauts. In the years 1960-1970 Mikhail Plyatskovsky becoming one of the leading songwriters. following popular songs were written in his poems:
 Take a Guitar
 Volga Flows Into My Heart
 All the Same, We Will Meet
 If There Is Love
 Cuckoo
 Once Again About Love
 Redhead Blizzard
 Slides
 You Invented Herself
 If You Are Good
 I'll Take You to the Tundra
 The Girl from Apartment 45
 Letkajenkka
 No Wonder the People I Talked
 The Roof of Your House
 Do Not Care About Me
 Do Not Repeat This Ever
and many others

Awards 
 Lenin Komsomol Prize (1986) -- for pioneering songs
 Order of the Badge of Honour

References

External links
 Рассказы и сказки Михаила Пляцковского, с иллюстрациями Сутеева
 ПоэзоСфера

1935 births
1991 deaths
Soviet poets
Soviet male poets
20th-century Russian male writers
People from Yenakiieve
Recipients of the Lenin Komsomol Prize
Socialist realism writers
Russian-language poets
Russian lyricists
Soviet songwriters
Burials in Troyekurovskoye Cemetery
Maxim Gorky Literature Institute alumni